Queenstown AFC is a amateur association football club in Queenstown, New Zealand, they are currently playing in the ODT Southern Men's Premier League.

Their home games are played at the Frankton Events Centre.

Queenstown are five-times winners of the Donald Gray Memorial Cup, the premier tournament in football in Southland, New Zealand.

Club history
The team gained notoriety in May 2007 when a brawl erupted during a Chatham Cup match between Queenstown and Invercargill club Queens Park which was fierce enough for local police to become involved.  

In 2020 the club won the Football South Championship.

References

External links
club website

Association football clubs in New Zealand
Sport in Queenstown, New Zealand
1996 establishments in New Zealand